Steven Tandy (born 23 October 1952, Sydney, Australia) is an Australian stage, television and film actor. He is best known for playing Tom Sullivan, the second eldest son in the classic Australian television series The Sullivans.

Biography
After graduating from the National Institute of Dramatic Art (NIDA) in 1971, Tandy landed the role in the Australian television series The Sullivans. Since then he has appeared often in film and stage roles. For thirteen years he played the role of Commodore Lassard in the Police Academy Stunt Show at Warner Bros. Movie World on the Gold Coast, Queensland. He returned to NIDA in 1995 to study directing.

Filmography

Television

Theatre

Awards and nominations

Stage awards
2006 – Won Gold Matilda Award for Best Actor in Last Drinks (play by Shaun Charles, based on Andrew McGahan's novel)

References

External links 

Productions since 2014, Kubler Auckland Management

1952 births
Australian male film actors
Australian male stage actors
Australian male television actors
Living people
Male actors from Sydney
20th-century Australian male actors
21st-century Australian male actors
People educated at Norwood Secondary College